Hycomine is a combination drug consisting of the following constituents:
Hydrocodone
Chlorpheniramine
Phenylephrine
Acetaminophen
Caffeine

It is a narcotic antitussive and analgesic with multiple actions qualitatively similar to those of codeine.

References

Combination drugs